Protoblepharus medogensis is a species of skink. It is endemic to Tibet.

References

Protoblepharus
Reptiles of China
Endemic fauna of Tibet
Reptiles described in 2020